Archbishop Michael (May 27, 1892 – July 13, 1958), born Thucydides Konstantinides, in Maroneia of Western Thrace, was the Primate of the Greek Orthodox Archdiocese of America from December 18, 1949, until his death on July 13, 1958. He succeeded Athenagoras who assumed the position of Patriarch of the Church of Constantinople in January 1949.

He was admitted to the Theological School of Halki in 1907. Archbishop Michael was ordained to the priesthood in 1919.  He was elected the Metropolitan of Corinth in 1939.

Archbishop Michael would have accepted the throne as Archbishop of America earlier in 1949, but he was not the first choice to replace Athenagoras I. Archbishop Timotheos Evangelinidis was elected to replace Athenagoras in June 1949, but suffered a series of heart attacks before taking the throne in America, and chose to remain the Metropolitan of Australia and New Zealand until his death later that year.

References

1958 deaths
Archbishops of the Greek Orthodox Archdiocese of America
Theological School of Halki alumni
1892 births
20th-century Eastern Orthodox bishops
Eastern Orthodox Christians from Greece
Greek expatriate bishops
People from Maroneia